The plastisphere consists of ecosystems that have evolved to live in human-made plastic environments. All plastic accumulated in marine ecosystems serves as a habitat for various types of microorganisms. The use of plastic has increased twenty-fold since 1964, and it is expected to double by 2035. Despite efforts to implement recycling programs, recycling rates tend to be quite low. For instance, in the EU, only 29% of the plastic consumed is recycled. The plastic that does not reach a recycling facility or landfill, will most likely end up in our oceans due to accidental dumping of the waste, losses during transport, or direct disposal from boats. In 2010, it was estimated that 4 to 12 million metric tons (Mt) of plastic waste entered into marine ecosystems.

Plastic pollution acts as a more durable "ship" than biodegradable material for carrying the organisms over long distances. This long-distance transportation can move microbes to different ecosystems and potentially introduce invasive species as well as harmful algae. The microorganisms found on the plastic debris include autotrophs, heterotrophs and symbionts. The ecosystem created by the plastisphere differs from other floating materials that naturally occur (i.e., feathers and algae) due to the slow speed of biodegradation and the different conditions. In addition to microbes, insects have come to flourish in areas of the ocean that were previously uninhabitable. The sea skater, for example, has been able to reproduce on the hard surface provided by the floating plastic.

Research 
The plastisphere was first described by a team of three scientists, Dr. Linda Amaral-Zettler from the Marine Biological Laboratory, Dr. Tracy Mincer from Woods Hole Oceanographic Institution and Dr. Erik Zettler from Sea Education Association. They collected plastic samples during research trips to study how the microorganisms function and alter the ecosystem.  They analyzed plastic fragments collected in nets from multiple locations within the Atlantic Ocean. The researchers used scanning electron micrographs to determine what was colonizing the plastic surface. The researchers used a combination of microscopy and DNA sequencing to identify thousands of diverse organisms that were distinct from the "natural" environment.  Among the most notable findings were the "pit formers" as they speculate that these cracks and pits provide evidence of biodegradation. Moreover, pit formers may also have the potential to break down hydrocarbons. In their analysis, the researchers also found members of the genus Vibrio, a genus which includes the bacteria that cause cholera and other gastrointestinal ailments. Some species of Vibrio can glow, and it is hypothesized that this attracts fish that eat the organisms colonizing the plastic, which then feed from the stomachs of the fish.

Since the discovery of the plastisphere there has a been a multitude of research published on the topic, and many have proposed that the microbial diversity within the plastisphere is very high. Other researchers have gone beyond simply identifying the types of microbes. For instance, one study in the South Pacific Ocean looked at the plastispheres potential  and  contribution, where they found a fairly low greenhouse gas contribution, but noted that this was dependent on the degree of nutrient concentration of the plastic type. In another study which looked at the factors influencing the diversity of the plastisphere, the researchers found that the highest degree of unique microorganisms tended to favour plastic pieces that were blue.

Degradation by microorganisms
Some microorganisms present in the plastisphere have the potential to degrade plastic materials. This could be potentially advantageous, as scientists may be able to utilize the microbes to break down plastic that would otherwise remain in our environment for centuries. On the other hand, as plastic is broken down into smaller pieces and eventually microplastics, there is a higher likelihood that it will be consumed by plankton and enter into the food chain. As plankton are eaten by larger organisms, the plastic may eventually cause there to be bioaccumulation in fish eaten by humans. The following table lists some microorganisms with biodegradation capacity

Oftentimes the degradation process of plastic by microorganisms is quite slow. However, scientists have been working towards genetically modifying these organisms in order to increase plastic biodegradation potential. For instance, Ideonella sakaiensis has been genetically modified to break down  PET at faster rates. Multiple chemical and physical pretreatments have also  demonstrated potential in enhancing the degree of biodegradation of different polymers. For instance UV or c-ray irradiation treatments, have been used to heighten the degree of biodegradation of certain plastics.

See also
 North Pacific Gyre
 Garbage patch
 Plastic pollution

References

Further reading
 
 
 
 

Plastics and the environment
Organisms breaking down plastic